Wavertree is a historic iron-hulled sailing ship built in 1885. Now the largest wrought iron sailing vessel afloat, it is located at the South Street Seaport in New York City.

History 
Wavertree was built in Southampton, England in 1885  and was one of the last large sailing ships built of wrought iron. She was built for the Liverpool company R.W. Leyland & Company, and is named after the Wavertree district of that city.

The ship was first used to carry jute between eastern India and Scotland. When less than two years old the ship entered the "tramp trades", taking cargoes anywhere in the world. In 1910, after sailing for a quarter century, the ship was dis-masted off Cape Horn and barely made it to the Falkland Islands. Rather than re-rigging the ship its owners sold it for use as a floating warehouse at Punta Arenas, Chile. Wavertree was converted into a sand barge at Buenos Aires, Argentina in 1947. This ship was discovered in 1967 at the Riachuelo River in Buenos Aires by an American citizen working on a sand barge and acquired by the South Street Seaport Museum in 1968. The ship was sent to the Arsenal Naval Buenos Aires for restoration. In 1969 after restoration was complete, the ship was towed to New York. The vessel was added to the National Register of Historic Places on June 13, 1978.

Restoration
In 2015, the ship was sent to Staten Island's Caddell Dry Dock and Repair Co. Inc. for a $13 million restoration, funded by New York City's Department of Cultural Affairs, city council and Manhattan's borough president. The restoration included the replacement of steel plates below the waterline, a new ballast system, updated electrical systems, and coating work that includes a cathodic protection system.
The restoration started in May 2015, and ended on 25 September 2016, when the ship returned to South Street Seaport museum.

References

External links 

 South Street Seaport Museum - Wavertree

South Street Seaport
Ships on the National Register of Historic Places in Manhattan
1885 ships
Museum ships in New York (state)
Sailing ships of England
1885 in England
Ships built in Southampton
Jute
Windjammers